Louis Hill may refer to:

 Louis A. Hill (1865–1933), official in the United States Department of the Treasury
 Louis G. Hill (1924–2013), member of the Pennsylvania State Senate
 Louis W. Hill (1872–1948), American railroad executive
 Louis Warren Hill Jr. (1902-1995), American businessman and politician
 Lou Hill (born 1944), Dutch-born Australian politician

See also
 Lewis Hill (disambiguation)